Andrew Neill Graffin (born 20 December 1977) is a British middle-distance runner. He competed in the men's 1500 metres at the 2000 Summer Olympics.

References

External links
 

1977 births
Living people
Athletes (track and field) at the 2000 Summer Olympics
British male middle-distance runners
Olympic athletes of Great Britain
Athletes from London